The National Mustard Museum (formerly the Mount Horeb Mustard Museum) is a museum near U.S. 14 in the heart of downtown Middleton, Wisconsin. It boasts a large display of prepared mustards. It is often featured in lists of unusual museums in the United States.

The museum was conceived and founded by Barry Levenson, former Assistant Attorney General of  Wisconsin.  It centers on a mustard collection he began in 1986 while despondent over the failure of his favorite baseball team, the Boston Red Sox, to win the 1986 World Series.  The initial dozen jars have grown to a collection of more than 5,300 mustards from more than 60 countries, along with hundreds of items of mustard memorabilia and exhibits depicting the use of mustard through history.

The museum opened its doors in Mount Horeb, Wisconsin, on April 6, 1992. It moved across the street to a larger site in October 2000.  In November 2009, the museum moved to Middleton and changed its name to the present one. 

Admission is free of charge, and the museum is open between 10 a.m. and 5 p.m., though it is closed on Easter, Thanksgiving, Christmas, and New Year's Day.

The museum's gift shop occupies about half of its floor space and offers free tasting of mustard samples from a refrigerated case containing scores of varieties; the museum also operates a mail-order mustard business.

Among the displays are sweet hot mustards, fruit mustards, hot pepper mustards, horseradish mustards, and spirit mustards. The collection includes a large variety of French and English mixes, but many other countries are also represented.

In 2002, the museum was showcased on the Food Network television series Unwrapped. The museum and its curator have also been featured on National Public Radio's Morning Edition broadcast of July 29, 2010, and Weekend Edition Saturday on February 18, 1995 (when it was located in Mount Horeb).

See also

 List of mustard brands

References

External links

 National Mustard Museum website

Museums in Dane County, Wisconsin
Mustard (condiment)
Food museums in the United States
History museums in Wisconsin
1992 establishments in Wisconsin
Museums established in 1992
Middleton, Wisconsin